Digital Freedom Foundation (DFF) is a non-profit organization established in 2004. The group is the lead organizer of Software Freedom Day, and Hardware Freedom Day, as well as other "freedom days".

History 

The organization was founded in 2004 as Software Freedom International, and formally registered as a charity in 2007. In 2011, the group changed its name to the "Digital Freedom Foundation" to reflect the creation of additional "freedom days" celebrating culture, hardware, and education.

In 2015, the DFF became responsible for organizing the annual Document Freedom Day, which was initially started by the Free Software Foundation Europe. The DFF had received tax-empt status in the United States under its original name in order to make donations tax-deductible. Since then, the organization moved to Hong Kong before registering in Cambodia following the relocation of several board members.

Events 
The Digital Freedom Foundation organizes the following "freedom day" events:
 Education Freedom Day (third Saturday in January)
 Document Freedom Day (last Wednesday of March)
 Hardware Freedom Day (third Saturday in April)
 Culture Freedom Day (third Saturday in May)
 Software Freedom Day (third Saturday in September)

Board members 

 Frederic Muller (President), founding member and former President of the Beijing GNU/Linux User Group, co-organizer of many international FOSS events in China and Asia such as the Linux Developer Symposium (2008), Gnome.Asia Summits, OOoCon 2008, and of course local SFD events. Fred is as well as co-maintainer of RUR-PLE (a python learning environment for children) and a GNOME Foundation member.
 Pockey Lam (VP, Treasurer), Former president of Beijing GNU/Linux User Group, founding member of SFDChina.org, GNOME.Asia Summit, College OSS Society and Beijing GNOME User Group.
 Julien Forgeat (Director), Former president of Beijing GNU/Linux User Group
 Patrick Sinz (Director)

Past board members 

 Matt Oquist
 JM C. Bitanga
 Quiliro Ordóñez
 Silvia Aimasso
 Alexjan Carraturo
 Pia Waugh (President), of Linux Australia
 Henrik Nilsen Omma of TheOpenCD project
 Phil Harper, of TheOpenCD project
 Benjamin Mako Hill, of the Free Software Foundation
 Sidsel Jensen, DKUUG
 Frederick Noronha, Goa SFD Team
 Joe Olutuase, of Knowledge House Africa
 Robert Schumann, of TheOpenCD project
 Jan Husar

See also 
 Public Domain Day
 International Day Against DRM, organized under the Defective by Design campaign

References

External links 
 Digital Freedom Foundation

Free and open-source software organizations